Shavkat Salomov (born 13 November 1985) is an Uzbekistani football striker for FK Surkhan Termez in the Uzbekistan Super League.

Career

Club
In February 2013 Salomov moved to Zhetysu, after playing 6 seasons for Bunyodkor. On 9 March 2013 Salomov in his debut match in Kazakhstan Premier League against Kairat, ended with draw 3:3, scored his first goal for club. In February 2014, he signed a contract with Shakhter Karagandy, another Kazakh club.

On 8 January 2018, Salomov signed for FK Buxoro.

International
Salomov made two appearances for the national team in the 2010 FIFA World Cup qualifying rounds.

Career statistics

Club

International

Statistics accurate as of match played 31 March 2015

International goals

Honours

Club
Bunyodkor
 Uzbek League (3): 2008, 2009, 2011
 Uzbek Cup (1): 2012

International
AFC Asian Cup 4th: 2011

References

External links
 
 

1985 births
Living people
Uzbekistani footballers
Uzbekistan international footballers
Uzbekistani expatriate footballers
2011 AFC Asian Cup players
Kazakhstan Premier League players
FC Bunyodkor players
Buxoro FK players
FC Shakhter Karagandy players
FC Zhetysu players
FC AGMK players
Expatriate footballers in Kazakhstan
Uzbekistani expatriate sportspeople in Kazakhstan
Association football midfielders
Uzbekistan Super League players